The 2009 East Carolina Pirates football team represented East Carolina University in the 2009 NCAA Division I FBS football season and played their home games in Dowdy–Ficklen Stadium. The team was coached by Skip Holtz, who was in his fifth and final year with the program. The 2009 Pirates were defending their first ever Conference USA Football Championship.

The Pirates finished the season 9–5, 7–1 in CUSA play, winning the East Division in their final regular season game against the Southern Mississippi Golden Eagles 25-20, and won their second consecutive CUSA Championship Game 38–32 against the Houston Cougars in Dowdy–Ficklen Stadium. The Pirates were invited to their second consecutive Liberty Bowl where they were defeated by Arkansas 20–17 in overtime.

Before the season

Recruiting

Purple/Gold Spring Game

The annual Purple/Gold Spring Game was held in the spring during the PirateFest and Pigskin Pigout weekend activities on April 18 in downtown Greenville, NC and put the "Pirates" team led by Redshirt Freshman Quarterback Josh Jordan against the "ECU" team led by Senior Quarterback Patrick Pinkney. The ECU team defeated the Pirates team 31-10.

Schedule

Coaching staff

Staff

Game summaries

Appalachian State

The Pirates renewed their rivalry with their former Southern Conference opponent for the first time since 1979. The Mountaineers led the all-time series 19-10, but the two schools had only played once since the split of Division I college football, with the Pirates defeating the Mountaineers 38-21 in 1979. This marked the first time since 2001 that the Pirates have played a school from the Football Championship Subdivision. After being dominated in the first half, Appalachian State staged a comeback but fell short after a sack and a blocked pass with seconds left in the 4th Quarter. ECU would hold on to win 29-24, improving their record against the Mountaineers to 11-19.

West Virginia

The Pirates went to Morgantown, WV to take on the 2008 Meineke Car Care Bowl Champion West Virginia Mountaineers, who remained undefeated at home in this series and led the all-time record 17-3. Last year, East Carolina blew out West Virginia 24-3 in Greenville. After going up 10-0 early in the first half, the Pirates would enter the second half trailing by 1, but the Mountaineers would pull ahead to win 35-20, improving their record to 18-3.

North Carolina

The Pirates travel to Chapel Hill, NC to face their in-state rival North Carolina. In 2007, the Pirates beat the Tar Heels with a last second field goal to win the game 34-31. The Tar Heels lead the all-time series, 8-2-1.

UCF

The Pirates face the 2007 Conference USA champion UCF Knights in Greenville, NC. Last year, the Pirates beat the Knights in Orlando, FL 13-10 in overtime and lead the all-time series 7-1.

Marshall

The Pirates head back to West Virginia to face the Thundering Herd of Marshall. The Pirates won last year 19-16 in Greenville, NC after one overtime and lead the all-time series 7-3. In 2007, the Herd spoiled the Pirates' hopes in Huntington for a spot in the Conference USA championship.

SMU

The Pirates face the Mustangs of Southern Methodist in Dallas, TX. The last time the two schools played was in Greenville, NC in 2006, where the Pirates won 38-21. East Carolina has won both games played in this series.

Rice

The Pirates face the 2008 Texas Bowl Champion Rice Owls at home. The two teams are tied in the series 1-1 after the Owls spoiled the Pirates' hopes to clinch the Conference USA East Division and participate in the Conference USA Football Championship in 2006.

Memphis

The Pirates travel to Liberty Bowl Memorial Stadium in Memphis, TN to face the Tigers of Memphis. The Pirates won last year in Greenville, NC 30-10 and lead the all-time series 11-6.

Virginia Tech

For the first time since 2000, the 2009 Orange Bowl Champion Hokies make the trip to Greenville, NC. Last year, the Hokies and Pirates squared off in Bank of America Stadium in Charlotte, NC, with the Pirates winning 27-22 after a Pontiac Game Changing Performance nominated blocked punt was returned by T.J. Lee. The Hokies lead the all time series 9-5.

Tulsa

In a rematch of the 2008 Conference USA Football Championship, the Pirates travel to Tulsa, OK to face the Golden Hurricane. Last year, the Pirates defeated the Golden Hurricane 27-24. Tulsa leads the all-time series 5-3.

UAB

The Pirates faced the UAB Blazers at home in Dowdy–Ficklen Stadium. In 2008 the Pirates defeated the Blazers in Birmingham, AL for the first time in this series' history. The two schools are tied in the all-time series 4-4.

Southern Miss

The Pirates will be hosting the rival Golden Eagles of Southern Miss. Of the 34 games played in this series, the Pirates have only won 8. Last year, the Golden Eagles beat the Pirates 21-3 in Hattiesburg, MS.

2009 Conference USA Championship

2010 AutoZone Liberty Bowl

Postseason

NFL Draft Picks
 Linval Joseph - Round 2: 14th (46th Overall) - New York Giants
 Matt Dodge - Round 7: 14th (221st Overall) - New York Giants
 C.J. Wilson - Round 7: 23rd (230th Overall) - Green Bay Packers

Awards
 Conference USA Special Teams Player-of-the-Year: Dwayne Harris, Jr. KR

Honors

Weekly Honors
Oct. 19 Conference USA Special Teams Player-of-the-Week - Dwayne Harris, Jr. KR
Nov. 16 Conference USA Defensive Player-of-the-Week - Emanuel Davis, So. DB
Nov. 23 Conference USA Special Teams Player-of-the-Week - Dwayne Harris, Jr. KR
Nov. 30 Conference USA Special Teams Player-of-the-Week - Ben Hartman, Sr. K

Teams
ESPN The Magazine University CoSIDA Academic All-America team - Sean Allen, Sr. OL
Sporting News Second-Team All America - Matt Dodge, Sr. P
Rivals.com Third-Team All America - Matt Dodge, Sr. P
Sports Illustrated Second-Team All-America - Matt Dodge, Sr. P
CollegeFootballNews Second-Team All-America - Matt Dodge, Sr. P
Phil Steele Magazine Fourth-Team All America - Matt Dodge, Sr. P

References

East Carolina
East Carolina Pirates football seasons
Conference USA football champion seasons
East Carolina Pirates football